Gottlieb Neumair (born 14 November 1939) is a German wrestler. He competed in the men's Greco-Roman featherweight at the 1960 Summer Olympics.

References

1939 births
Living people
German male sport wrestlers
Olympic wrestlers of the United Team of Germany
Wrestlers at the 1960 Summer Olympics
Sportspeople from Munich